Harold Jones (born February 27, 1940) is an American traditional pop and jazz drummer who is best known as the drummer for Tony Bennett and for his five years with the Count Basie Orchestra.

In a career spanning six decades, Jones has toured and recorded with Frank Sinatra, Duke Ellington, Oscar Peterson, Herbie Hancock, B.B. King, Ray Charles and Tony Bennett. He has also played with major symphony orchestras, including those in Boston, Atlanta, Chicago, London, Los Angeles, San Francisco, and Vienna.

Career
Born and raised in Richmond, Indiana, Jones's parents encouraged his childhood musical development. Already a skilled drummer by high school, his mother drove him to Indianapolis, Indiana, to perform with Wes Montgomery, who left the stage with his band while Jones played a twenty-minute drum solo.

He attended the American Conservatory of Music in Chicago on a scholarship, then took work where he could find it, including theaters and night clubs. In 1967, while house drummer at the Chicago Playboy Club, he was invited to New York for what was intended to be a two-week engagement with Count Basie's orchestra but which lasted five years. Jones played on fifteen albums with Basie. He also appears in a scene featuring the Basie band in the movie Blazing Saddles.

Jones says he was an avid student of other drummers, but he was especially influenced by one of Basie's drummers. "I am proud to say that I took everything that I could from Sonny Payne," he told an interviewer.

After leaving the Basie band, Jones was much in demand. He toured with Ella Fitzgerald, then for ten years with Sarah Vaughan. He also toured and recorded with Natalie Cole, including on her album Unforgettable... with Love. In 1962, he was a member of the Paul Winter Sextet, the first jazz group to play at the White House since the 1920s. The group had finished a tour of Latin America on behalf of United States Cultural Exchange Programs. Jones has played at the White House five times. In 2004, Jones joined Tony Bennett as his drummer for recordings and touring. He stayed with him until Bennett retired in 2021. Still a touring drummer, Jones also teaches drumming at college workshops.

Personal life
Jones has lived for many years with his second wife Denise in Woodacre, California. The pair married June 9, 1983, and they have a son. Jones married his first wife, Paulette, in 1961. During their ten-year marriage they had a son and a daughter.

Jones's brother, Melvyn "Deacon" Jones, was a blues and soul organist.

Awards and accolades
In 2013 Jones was inducted into the Percussive Arts Society Hall of Fame. In 1972 he won Best New Artist in the Down Beat magazine critics' poll. Saxophonist and band leader Paul Winter called Jones "the personification off jazz." Music critic Bruce H. Klauber has written that, "Jones is the quintessential big-band drummer with a crisp, clean sound notable for the high-pitched snare drum crack." Critic Jess Hamlin called Jones, "One of the best drummers in the business." Basie is said to have told drummer Louie Bellson that "Harold Jones was my favorite drummer."

Jones is the subject of a biography published in 2011, Harold Jones: The Singer's Drummer.

Discography
Unless otherwise noted, Information is based on Harold Jones' AllMusic web page

With Christina Aguilera
 My Kind of Christmas (RCA Records, 2000)
With Ernestine Anderson
 Live at the 1990 Concord Jazz Festival Third Set (Concord Records, 1991)
With Count Basie
 Basie Straight Ahead (Dot Records, 1968)
With Tony Bennett
 Duets: An American Classic (Columbia Records, 2006)
 A Swingin' Christmas (Columbia, 2008)
 Duets II (Columbia, 2011)
With Elvin Bishop
 The Blues Rolls On (Delta Groove, 2008)
With Raquel Bitton
 Sings Edith Piaf (R.B., 1999)
 Dream a Little Dream (R.B., 2002)
With Richard Boone
 The Singer (Storyville, 1988)
With Bruce Broughton
 Miracle on 34th Street: Original Soundtrack Album (BMG, 1994)
With Red Callender
 Basin Street Brass (Legend, 1973)
With Benny Carter
 'Live and Well in Japan! (Pablo, 1978)
With Natalie Cole
 Unforgettable... with Love (Elektra Records, 1991)
 Take a Look (Elektra Records, 1993)
 Holly & Ivy (Elektra, 1994)
 Stardust (Elektra Records, 1996)
 Snowfall on the Sahara (Elektra Records, 1999)
 Still Unforgettable (Atco, 2008)
With Michael Feinstein
 Such Sweet Sorrow (Atlantic Records, 1995)
With Lady Gaga and Tony Bennett
 Cheek to Cheek (Columbia Records, 2014)
 Love for Sale (Columbia Records, 2021)
With Amy Grant
 Home for Christmas (A&M Records, 1992)
With João Gilberto
 João Gilberto and the Stylists of Bossa Nova Sing Antonio Carlos Jobim (Cherry Red, 2017)
With Bunky Green
 Playin' for Keeps (Cadet, 1966)
With John Handy
 Carnival (ABC Records, 1977)
With Eddie Harris Jazz Band
 The Exodus to Jazz (Vee-Jay, 1961)
 Mighty Like a Rose (Vee-Jay, 1961)
 A Study in Jazz (Vee-Jay, 1962)
With Gene Harris
 Black and Blue (Concord Records, 1991)
 World Tour 1990 (Concord Records, 1991)
With Linda Hopkins
 Deep in the Night (View Video, 2009)
With Quincy Jones & Sammy Nestico Orchestra
 Basie and Beyond (Warner Bros. Records, 2000)
With Marian McPartland
 Plays the Benny Carter Songbook (Concord Records, 1990)
 Silent Pool (Concord Records, 1997)
With Walter Norris Trio
 Lush Life (Concord Records, 1991)
With Oscar Peterson
 Soul Español (Limelight, 1966)
With Pitbull
 El Mariel (Bad Boy Latino, 2006)
 The Boatlift (Bad Boy Latino, 2007)
With Diane Schuur
 Pure Schuur (GRP, 1991)
With Andy Simpkins Quintet
 Calamba (Discovery, 1989)
With Michael W. Smith
 Christmastime (Reunion, 1998)
With Thomas Talbert
 Louisiana Suite (Sea Breeze, 1977)
With Clark Terry
 Reunion (D'Note Classics, 1995)
With John Travolta and Olivia Newton-John
 This Christmas (UME, 2012)
With Sarah Vaughan
 Crazy and Mixed Up (Pablo, 1982)
With Sarah Vaughan and Los Angeles Philharmonic
 Gershwin Live! (Columbia Records, 1982)
With Larry Vuckovich and Jon Hendricks
 Reunion (Tetrachord, 2004)
With Robbie Williams
 Swing When You're Winning (Chrysalis Records, 2001)
With Paul Winter Sextet
 Jazz Meets the Bossa Nova (Columbia Records, 1962)
With Paul Winter Consort
 Spanish Angel (Living Music, 1993)
With Amy Winehouse
 Lioness: Hidden Treasures (Island, 2011)

References

External links
 Official site
 Harold Jones: Count Basie and Beyond…, Drummer's Resource, podcast, Nick Ruffini, April 7, 2014.
 Oral Histories: Harold Jones, National Association of Music Merchants Foundation, July 30, 2010.
 Drummer Harold Jones Performs at White House Concert. John F. Kennedy Presidential Library and Museum. November 19, 1962.
 Harold Jones Drummerworld Top 500 Drummers.

1940 births
Living people
Musicians from Richmond, Indiana
American jazz drummers
Count Basie Orchestra members
20th-century American drummers
American male drummers
American male jazz musicians